Daskot Point (‘Nos Daskot’ \'nos d&-'skot\) is the ice-covered point on the north side of the entrance to Yamforina Cove on Blagoevgrad Peninsula, Oscar II Coast in Graham Land, Antarctica.  It was formed as a result of the break-up of Larsen Ice Shelf in the area in 2002.

The feature is named after the settlement of Daskot in northern Bulgaria.

Location
SCAR Antarctic Digital Database mapping in 2012.

Maps
Antarctic Digital Database (ADD). Scale 1:250000 topographic map of Antarctica. Scientific Committee on Antarctic Research (SCAR). Since 1993, regularly upgraded and updated.

References
 Daskot Point. SCAR Composite Antarctic Gazetteer.
 Bulgarian Antarctic Gazetteer. Antarctic Place-names Commission. (details in Bulgarian, basic data in English)

External links
 Daskot Point. Copernix satellite image

Headlands of Graham Land
Oscar II Coast
Bulgaria and the Antarctic